The black-throated wren-babbler (Turdinus atrigularis) is a species of bird in the family Pellorneidae. It is endemic to the island of Borneo (mainly southern Brunei and East Malaysia).

Its natural habitats are subtropical or tropical moist lowland forest and subtropical or tropical moist montane forest. It is threatened by habitat loss.

References

Collar, N. J. & Robson, C. 2007. Family Timaliidae (Babblers)  pp. 70 – 291 in; del Hoyo, J., Elliott, A. & Christie, D.A. eds. Handbook of the Birds of the World, Vol. 12. Picathartes to Tits and Chickadees. Lynx Edicions, Barcelona.

black-throated wren-babbler
Birds of Brunei
Birds of East Malaysia
Endemic birds of Borneo
black-throated wren-babbler
Taxa named by Charles Lucien Bonaparte
Taxonomy articles created by Polbot